This is a list of notable people who have been described at any time as androgynous in their persona or presentation, either by self-identification or in reliable sources.

List

See also
 Lists of LGBT people
 List of people with non-binary gender identities

References 

 
Lists of LGBT-related people